The Samsung Omnia M (also known as the S7530) is a budget smartphone developed by Samsung. Part of the Omnia series, it was announced in May 2012 and released in July 2012 in the European market.  The phone also became available in China on China Mobile and China Unicom, as well as in Brazil.  A version was planned for China Telecom but was never released.

Primary features
The primary features of the Omnia M are:
 4.0in 800×480 Super AMOLED 233 PPI touchscreen display
 5 MP primary camera
 VGA video and photo recording
 0.3 MP front facing camera
 Microsoft Windows Phone 7.5 operating system

Availability
The phone officially launched on July 31, 2012, and was originally for sale exclusively through Phones 4u in the United Kingdom at £289.95.  In Italy and other European markets, the device launched for €294.99.  The Omnia M was also released in Brazil for R$799.  When the Omnia M was launched in China, the variant sold by China Unicom shipped with 8 GB of internal storage instead of the usual 4 GB.

Reception
The Omnia M received mixed feedback upon its announcement and launch.  Reviewers noted the relatively high price for the device compared to its hardware specifications and competing devices.  The device was praised for its build, camera, display, and battery life; however, its low RAM and built-in storage were areas of concern, as the 4 GB variant had only 2.5 GB of user-accessible storage due to default applications.  Additionally, the lack of HSPA+ or DC-HSPA+ was criticized as providing insufficient data speed compared to other devices.  The device was also compared to its predecessor, the Omnia W.

References

Omnia M
Samsung smartphones
Mobile phones introduced in 2012
Windows Phone devices
Mobile phones with user-replaceable battery